The Wedding is a 2018 film directed by Sam Abbas and starring Nikohl Boosheri, Sam Abbas, Harry Aspinwall, James Penfold, and Hend Ayoub.

Production
In August 2017, it was announced Nikohl Boosheri, Sam Abbas, Harry Aspinwall, James Penfold and Send Ayoub joined the cast of the film, with Sam Abbas directing the film from a screenplay he wrote. Neal Kumar, Casey Hartnett, Abbas, and Kyleigh Johnson would produce. The Wedding was announced during the Berlin Film Festival as the first title of ArabQ Films.

Cast
 Nikohl Boosheri as Sara
 Sam Abbas as Rami 
 Harry Aspinwall as Lee 
 James Penfold as Tom
 Hend Ayoub as Abir

Release
The film's trailer was released exclusively via The Hollywood Reporter on August 25, 2018. HuffPost called the film "The Queer Movie That Could Make Waves In The Middle East". Raseef, an Egyptian newspaper, said the film would "cause fuss in theaters".

The film had a secret work-in-progress screening in Egypt in August 2018. Screenings in the Middle East started in November 2018, and were done in select theaters and by invitation.

Reception 
Variety gave the film a negative review, calling it "dull" and saying it lacked originality. Additionally, they questioned whether it could be categorized as Egyptian, since the film's story and characters were so removed from Egypt and Egyptian society. Similarly, The Hollywood Reporter criticized the movie's execution, calling it "more a muted relationship drama than a timely exploration of clashing sexual and religious values".

References

External links
 
 
 Profile on Mubi (streaming service)

2018 films
2018 independent films
2018 multilingual films
2010s American films
2010s Arabic-language films
2010s English-language films
American drama films
American independent films
American multilingual films